Dalmas may refer to:

People
 Charles Dalmas (1863–1938), French architect who mainly worked in Nice
 Dalmas Otieno, Kenyan politician
 John Dalmas (1926–2017), author of science fiction
 Marcel Dalmas (1892–1950), French architect who mainly worked in Nice
  (1862–1930), a French ornithologist and arachnologist
 Susana Dalmás (1948–2012), Uruguayan politician
 Yannick Dalmas (born 1961), former racing driver from France
 Dalmas I of Semur (c. 985 - 1048), medieval French nobleman of Burgundy
 Dalmas (Dalmace), (c. 1086-1097), a bishop of the Ancient Diocese of Narbonne

Places
 Dalmas, India, a village in Sikar district, Rajasthan
 Saint-Dalmas-le-Selvage, a commune in the Alpes-Maritimes department in south-eastern France

Other uses
 Dalmas (film), a 1973 Australian film